Edoardo Defendi (born 24 August 1991) is an Italian footballer. He plays for Serie D club Termoli.

Biography

Brescia
Born in Trescore Balneario, Lombardy, Defendi started his career at Lombard side Brescia. Defendi spent 3 seasons on loan to various Lega Pro clubs from 2011 to 2014.

Como
On 18 June 2014 Como bought 50% registration rights from Brescia. Defendi scored 7 goals in the first edition of Lega Pro Unica Divisione plus 1 goal in semi-final match against Matera .

Return to Brescia
In June 2015 both club failed to form a deal for the price of the player, which Brescia bought back the 50% registration rights by submitting a higher bid to Lega Serie B, the mediator.

Defendi wore no.21 shirt for Brescia in 2015–16 Serie B. However, on 26 August Defendi was signed by Arezzo in a temporary deal.

Melfi and Santarcangelo 
In 2016–17 season he played for Melfi in the first half; in January 2017 he moved to Santarcangelo.

Pro Patria
On 10 July 2019, he signed with Pro Patria.

References

External links
 AIC profile (data by football.it) 
 

1991 births
Sportspeople from the Province of Bergamo
People from Trescore Balneario
Footballers from Lombardy
Living people
Association football forwards
Italian footballers
Brescia Calcio players
FeralpiSalò players
A.S.D. Victor San Marino players
Como 1907 players
S.S. Arezzo players
A.C. Cuneo 1905 players
Aurora Pro Patria 1919 players
Arzachena Academy Costa Smeralda players
U.S.D. Recanatese 1923 players
A.S.D. Termoli Calcio 1920 players
Serie C players
Serie D players